Feminine psychology or the psychology of women is an approach that focuses on social, economic, and political issues confronting women all throughout their lives. It emerged as a reaction to male-dominated developmental theories such as Sigmund Freud's view of female sexuality. The original work of Karen Horney argued that male realities cannot describe female psychology or define their gender because they are not informed by girls' or women's experiences. Theorists claimed this new feminist approach was required, and that women's social existence was crucial in understanding their psychology. It is suggested in Dr. Carol Gilligan's research that some characteristics of female psychology emerge to comply with the given social order defined by men and not necessarily because it is the nature of their gender or psychology.

Horney's theory 
The "feminine psychology" approach is often attributed to the pioneering work of Karen Horney, a psychologist from the late 19th century. She contradicted Sigmund Freud's psychoanalytic theory, arguing that it is male-dominated and, therefore, harbored biases and phallocentric views. Horney claimed that for this reason, Freud's theory cannot describe femininity because it is informed by male reality and not by actual female experience. An example of this is Freud's proposition that the female personality tends to exhibit penis envy, whereby a girl interprets her failure to possess a penis as a punishment for wrongdoing and later blames her mother. As Freud stated, "she has seen it and knows that she is without it and wants to have it." Horney argued that it is not penis envy but basic anxiety, hostility, and anger towards the opposite-sex parent, whom she views as competition for the affection of the same-sex parent, and thus views her as a direct threat to her safety and security. She believed as part of her feminine psychology theory, that this aspect should be resolved based on interpersonal dynamics (e.g. differences in social power) rather than sexual dynamics.

Horney countered the Freudian concept: she deconstructed penis envy and described it as nothing more than women wanting to express their own natural needs for success and the security that is characteristic of both sexes. There is an analogy that describes Horney's feminine psychology as optimistic of the world and life affirmation in comparison with Freud's pessimism oriented towards world and life negation.

Motherhood vs. Career 
One dynamic outlined by feminine psychologists is the balancing act between more traditional roles of motherhood and the more modern role of a career woman. The roles do not necessarily contradict each other: additional income helps provide for the family and working mothers may feel as though they are making a contribution to society beyond the family.

Both mothers and fathers feel the pressure of balancing both work and family life, and fathers spend more time at home and engage in child care and housework more than they did a century ago. A study conducted by the Pew Research Center indicates that 42% of respondents believe that a mother who works part-time is an ideal scenario while 16% think that working full-time is ideal for mothers, and the rest think that mothers should stay at home. 46% of fathers also reported that they felt they were not spending enough time with their children: fathers who responded to this Pew research survey were spending about half as much time providing child care as the mothers. 15% of working fathers stated that it is very difficult to balance work and take care of their children. The same study found that 50% of working fathers say that it is at least somewhat difficult to balance work and child care responsibilities. However, fathers who are able to assist in child care report that they like doing so, often even more-so than mothers. The Pew Research Center also asked parents to rate how good of a job they are doing as parents. It was found that most mothers and women rated themselves as doing an excellent or very good job, but that working mothers rated themselves a lot higher than non-working mothers did-despite the fact that parents who felt they spent too little time with their children were less likely to rate themselves as doing an excellent job. The Pew Research Center has taken on several studies and surveys in order to research and investigate the differences associated with feminine psychology and the people’s views on the progression of women in the workplace and their place in the home. 

According to a study conducted by Dr. Jennifer Stuart, a woman's past can influence how, or if, she chooses to balance her work and home lives. Specifically, Stuart asserts that the primary determinant is a woman's "quality of her relationship with her mother. Women whose mothers fostered feelings of both warm attachment and confident autonomy may find ways to enjoy their children and/or work, often modifying work and family environments in ways that favor both".

Working women sometimes make compromises in their careers so that they can balance paid work and motherhood responsibilities. These compromises include cutting back hours and accepting lower pay or a lower job status, which can prevent women from becoming the top performers in a workplace.

According to Dr. Ramon Resa, mothers have to remember that "children are fairly resilient and will adapt to whatever changes are required. They are also astute at sensing unhappiness, disappointment and apathy".

See also 
 Analytical psychology
 Feminization (sociology)
 Feminist psychology

References

Sources
 Brinjikji, Hiam. (1999). Property Rights of Women in Nineteenth Century England. Unpublished manuscript, Department of English, University of Maryland, College Park, M.D. Retrieved from: http://www.umd.umich.edu/casl/hum/eng/classes/434/geweb/PROPERTY.htmhttp://webspace.ship.edu/cgboer/horney.html
 Engler, Barbara. (2009). Personality Theories. 8th Ed. Houghton Mifflin Harcourt, Print.
 Horney & Humanistic Psychoanalysis: Major Concepts. International Karen Horney Society. N.p., 18JUN2002. Web. 21 October 2010. Retrieved from: https://web.archive.org/web/20110523100527/http://plaza.ufl.edu/bjparis/horney/fadiman/04_major.html
 Perron, Roger. Inferiority, Feeling of. Encyclopedia.com. N.p., 2005. Web. 21 October 2010. Retrieved from: http://www.encyclopedia.com/doc/1G2-3435300700.html.
 Lambert, Tim. (n.d.). 16th Century Women. Retrieved from http://www.localhistories.org/women.html
 Lowe, Maggie. (1989). Early College Women: Determined to be Educated. Unpublished manuscript, Department of History, State University of New York, Potsdam, NY. Retrieved from: https://web.archive.org/web/20101207145451/http://www.northnet.org/stlawrenceaauw/college.htm
 The Woman Suffrage Timeline. (2007). Retrieved from: http://www.thelizlibrary.org/suffrage/
 Women in the Senate. (n.d.). Retrieved from: https://www.senate.gov/artandhistory/history/common/briefing/women_senators.htm
 Horney, K. (1967). The Flight from Womanhood: The masculinity-complex in women as viewed by men and by women. In H. Kelman (Ed.) Feminine psychology. New York: Norton
 Schultz, D., Schultz, S. (2009). Theories of Personality (9th Ed.) New York: Wadsworth, Cengage Learning
 Hansen, R., Hansen, J., Pollycove, R. (2002). Mother nurture: a mother’s guide to health in body, mind and intimate relationships. New York: Viking Penguin.
 Kapur, M. (5 August 2005). Balancing motherhood and a career. CNN.com International. Retrieved from: http://edition.cnn.com/2004/BUSINESS/08/04/maternity.leave/index.html
 Resa, R. (8 December 2009). Give up a career or give up motherhood. The Huffington Post. Retrieved from: http://www.huffingtonpost.com/ramon-resa-md/give-up-a-career-or-give_b_383645.html
 Parker, Kim. "Modern Parenthood." Pew Research Center's Social Demographic Trends Project RSS. Social and Demographic Trends, 13 March 2013. Web. 15 February 2016. Retrieved from: http://www.pewsocialtrends.org/2013/03/14/modern-parenthood-roles-of-moms-and-dads-converge-as-they-balance-work-and-family/
 Livingston, Gretchen. “For most highly educated women, motherhood doesn’t start until the 30s.” Pew Research Center’s Social Demographic Trends Project RSS. Social and Demographic Trends, 15 January 2015. Web. 15 February 2016. Retrieved from: http://www.pewresearch.org/fact-tank/2015/01/15/for-most-highly-educated-women-motherhood-doesnt-start-until-the-30s/
Jorge M. Agüero and Mindy S. Marks, “Motherhood and Female Labor Force Participation: Evidence from Infertility Shocks,” The American Economic Review 98, no. 2 (2008): 500–504.

External links 
Family and career path characteristics as predictors of women’s objective and subjective career success: Integrating traditional and protean career explanations 
Spots of Light: Women in the Holocaust an online exhibition by Yad Vashem

Psychology
 
Gender psychology